{{DISPLAYTITLE:C14H18O4}}
The molecular formula C14H18O4 (molar mass: 250.29 g/mol) may refer to :

 Cinoxate, an ingredient in some types of sunscreens
 Trolox,  water-soluble derivative of vitamin E
 Gregatin B, a fungal metabolite

Molecular formulas